Bid Kaneh (also Romanized as Bīd Kaneh, Bīdgeneh and Bīdganeh) is a village in Malard-e Jonubi Rural District of the Central District of Malard County, Tehran province, Iran. At the 2006 National Census, its population was 5,640 in 1,467 households, when it was in the former Malard District of Shahriar County. The following census in 2011 counted 6,009 people in 1,665 households, by which time the district had been separated from the county and Malard County established. The latest census in 2016 showed a population of 6,193 people in 1,845 households; it was the largest village in its rural district.

Arsenal explosion 

Bid Kaneh arsenal explosion was a large explosion that occurred about 13:30 local time, 12 November 2011 in Iran's Moddares garrison missile base.

References

External links 
Bank of the villages's information on Iran

Malard County

Populated places in Tehran Province

Populated places in Malard County